Billy Nordström (born 18 September 1995) is a Swedish footballer who plays for Utsikten as a defender.

Personal life
Billy grew up in Gothenburg suburb Angered with six older siblings. He's been supporting IFK Göteborg his entire life.

On 16 December 2018, Billy joined IF Brommapojkarna. One year later, he signed a one-year contract with Östers IF.

Career statistics

Club

References

External links
 

1995 births
Footballers from Gothenburg
Living people
Swedish footballers
Association football defenders
Sweden youth international footballers
IFK Göteborg players
Varbergs BoIS players
IF Brommapojkarna players
Östers IF players
Utsiktens BK players
Allsvenskan players
Superettan players